Victor-Marie d'Estrées, Duke of Estrées count then duke (1723) of Estrées (30 November 1660, Paris – 27 December 1737, Paris) was a Marshal of France and subsequently known as the "Maréchal d'Estrées".

Biography
Son of Marshal Jean d'Estrées, Count of Estrées (1624–1707), Victor Marie began his military career in the infantry in 1676, but joined the Navy one year later.
In the Franco-Dutch War (1672–1678), he commanded a ship in the Battle of Tabago (3 March 1677) and fought afterwards in the Mediterranean.

At the beginning of the War of the Grand Alliance, he volunteered in the army and was wounded in the siege of Philippsburg in 1688. In 1690, he commanded 20 ships in the Battle of Beachy Head. Then, on command of Louis XIV, he took charge of the Mediterranean fleet and supported the Duke of Vendôme in the conquest of Barcelona in 1697.

In 1698, he married Lucie Félicité de Noailles (°1683), daughter of Marshal Anne Jules de Noailles, Duke of Noailles. They had no children.

At the beginning of the War of Spanish Succession, he was ordered to sail Philip V of Spain to Naples to claim the throne of the Two Sicilies.

The success of this mission earned him the title of Grandee of Spain. He received the title of Marshal of France in 1703, and commander in the Order of the Holy Spirit in 1705.

In 1704, Estrées was appointed mentor to the Count of Toulouse, illegitimate son of Louis XIV and admiral of France. Together they fought the tactically indecisive Battle of Vélez-Málaga (24 August 1704).

During the Regency of Philippe d'Orléans, Duke of Orléans, Regent of France, he was member of the council and minister, but he had no political skills.

After the death of his father he inherited the title of Viceroy of the American Islands and received the island of Saint Lucia as his private property. He gathered an enormous fortune.

He spent his fortune buying art and books, accumulating it in his Paris house and castles, never unpacking a large proportion of the collection.

He was elected member of the Académie française in 1715.
He became Duke of Estrées and Peer of France in 1723, after the death of his uncle.
He died in 1737.

The cruiser Destrées and D'Estrees Bay in South Australia was named in his honour.

References

External links
 Notice sur le site de l'École nationale des chartes
 Notice biographique de l'Académie française

1660 births
1737 deaths
Military personnel from Paris
 5
Marshals of France
Grandees of Spain
Members of the Académie Française
Members of the French Academy of Sciences
Members of the Académie des Inscriptions et Belles-Lettres
French military personnel of the Nine Years' War
French naval commanders in the War of the Spanish Succession
Secretaries of State of the Navy (France)
Knights of the Golden Fleece of Spain
18th-century French people
17th-century French people
People of the Regency of Philippe d'Orléans
People of the Ancien Régime
18th-century peers of France